Einar Thulin (April 21, 1896 – October 20, 1963) was a Swedish track and field athlete who competed in the 1920 Summer Olympics. In 1920 he finished seventh in the high jump competition.

References

External links
profile 

1896 births
1963 deaths
Swedish male high jumpers
Olympic athletes of Sweden
Athletes (track and field) at the 1920 Summer Olympics